Ivy Nicholson (February 22, 1933 – October 25, 2021) was an American model and actress.

Early life 
Nicholson grew up in Cypress Hills, New York. World magazine reported that she was "born to a humble working-class family".  She started working as a model at 16. She first modeled in a Brooklyn department store, after winning a beauty contest. In her teens she settled in Greenwich Village and worked in the Garment District.

Model 
She appeared on the covers of major fashion magazines such as Vogue Harper's Bazaar, Life, Mademoiselle and Elle.

In the mid-Fifties she was romantically linked with Colin Tennant, son of the second Baron Glenconnor.

Nicholson moved to Italy and worked for fashion designers such as Irene Galitzine, Fernanda Gattinoni, the Sorelle Fontana, Simonetta, Alberto Fabiani and Emilio Pucci.  Salvador Dalí painted her for Life Magazine.

According to a 1960 profile in Look Magazine, Nicholson was painted by Marc Chagall, Lucian Freud and her friend Bernard Buffet.

At the time of the Look article she was living in Paris, the wife of French writer and actor, Count Regis Ruyneau St. Georges de Poleon.

Andy Warhol's Factory 
Nicholson returned to the United States and entered into Andy Warhol's circle.  "Andy was taken by her," said Gerard Malanga, a poet and photographer who was part of the Warhol circle. "She became his first superstar."

In a caption to a 1966 photo he took of her, Billy Name, a photographer associated with Andy Warhol's Factory recorded "...the glamorous model Ivy Nicholson who had recently arrived in New York from Europe".

She acted in films made by the Factory.  She was depicted in the film Andy Warhol's Factory People. She frugged for a few minutes in the film Lonesome Cowboys.

Describing her activities at the Factory, biographer Victor Bockris described her as "a tough, violent and hysterical woman".  Catherine O'Sullivan Schorr included a picture of Nicholson in her book Andy Warhol's Factory People with the caption "Fiery fashion model Ivy Nicholson in a rare docile moment sits for a Warhol Screen Test".

Personal life 
Nicholson had four children: three sons and a daughter.  In 1963 she met and married John Palmer, a co-director of Warhol's silent film Empire.  Their short marriage produced twins. Nicholson also had a son by a different man.

The San Francisco Chronicle reported that in the early 1980s Ivy Nicholson was "living the low life in the Tenderloin."

Subsequently, for some time she was homeless in San Francisco.  According to the New York Times "She spent her last decades in or near poverty, sometimes homeless, telling anyone who would listen that she was on her way back up."

Prior to 2014 Ivy and her son Gunther lived together in a small apartment at the North Shore of Staten Island.

In 2014 Nicholson lived in Venice Beach, California, but she was homeless again by 2018. Nicholson died on October 25, 2021, at an assisted living facility in Bellflower, California. She was 88.

References 

1933 births
2021 deaths
American models
People from East New York, Brooklyn